A peroxy acid (often spelled as one word, peroxyacid, and sometimes called peracid) is an acid which contains an acidic –OOH group.  The two main classes are those derived from conventional mineral acids, especially sulfuric acid, and the peroxy derivatives of organic carboxylic acids.  They are generally strong oxidizers.

Inorganic peroxy acids

Peroxymonosulfuric acid (Caro's acid) is probably the most important inorganic peracid, at least in terms of its production scale. It is used for the bleaching of pulp and for the detoxification of cyanide in the mining industry. It is produced by treating sulfuric acid with hydrogen peroxide. Peroxymonophosphoric acid (H3PO5) is prepared similarly.

Some peroxy acids are only hypothetical, but their anions are known. This is the case for peroxycarbonate and perborate (see sodium perborate).

Organic peracids
Several organic peroxyacids are commercially useful. They can be prepared in several ways.  Most commonly, peracids are generated by treating the corresponding carboxylic acid with hydrogen peroxide:

RCO2H  +  H2O2      RCO3H  +  H2O
A related reaction involves treatment of the carboxylic anhydride:
(RCO)2O  +  H2O2   →   RCO3H  +  RCO2H
This method is popular for converting cyclic anhydrides to the corresponding monoperoxyacids, for example monoperoxyphthalic acid.
The third method involves treatment of acid chlorides:
RC(O)Cl  +  H2O2   →   RCO3H  +  HCl
meta-Chloroperoxybenzoic acid (mCPBA) is prepared in this way.

A related method starts with the peroxyanhydride.

Aromatic aldehydes can be autoxidized to give peroxycarboxylic acids:
Ar-CHO + O2 → Ar-COOOH (Ar = aryl group)
The products, however, react with the initial aldehyde forming the carboxylic acid:

Ar-COOOH + Ar-CHO → 2 Ar-COOH

Properties and uses
In terms of acidity, peroxycarboxylic acids are about 1000 times weaker than the parent carboxylic acid, due to the absence of resonance stabilization of the anion.  For similar reasons, their pKa values tend also to be relatively insensitive to substituents.

The most common use of organic peroxy acids is for the conversion of alkenes to epoxides, the Prilezhaev reaction.  Another common reaction is conversion of cyclic ketones to the ring-expanded esters using peracids in a Baeyer-Villiger oxidation.  They are also used for the oxidation of amines and thioethers to amine oxides and sulfoxides.  The laboratory applications of the valued reagent mCPBA illustrate these reactions. 

Reaction of peroxycarboxylic acids with acid chlorides affords diacyl peroxides:

RC(O)Cl  +  RC(O)O2H   →   (RC(O))2O2  +  HCl

The oxidizing tendency of peroxides is related to the electronegativity of the substituents. Electrophilic peroxides are stronger oxygen-atom transfer agents. The oxygen-atom donor tendency correlates with the acidity of the O−H bond. Thus, the order of oxidizing power is CF3CO3H > CH3CO3H > H2O2.

See also
 Organic peroxide
 Peracetic acid
 Peroxyacyl nitrates

References

Organic peroxy acids
Oxidizing agents